Kryspin Szcześniak (born 8 January 2001) is a Polish professional footballer who plays as a defender for Ekstraklasa side Górnik Zabrze, on loan from Pogoń Szczecin.

Career statistics

Club

Notes

References

2001 births
Living people
Sportspeople from Gorzów Wielkopolski
Polish footballers
Poland youth international footballers
Association football defenders
Ekstraklasa players
I liga players
III liga players
Stilon Gorzów Wielkopolski players
Pogoń Szczecin players
GKS Jastrzębie players
Górnik Łęczna players
Górnik Zabrze players